Riccardo Steinleitner (10 January 1915 – May 1998) was an Italian rower. He competed in the men's single sculls event at the 1936 Summer Olympics.

References

1915 births
1998 deaths
Italian male rowers
Olympic rowers of Italy
Rowers at the 1936 Summer Olympics
Sportspeople from Turin